The 1994 Football League Cup Final took place on 27 March 1994 at the old Wembley Stadium. It was contested between Manchester United and Aston Villa. Aston Villa won 3–1, with one goal from Dalian Atkinson and two from Dean Saunders, to claim their fourth League Cup final victory; Manchester United's goal was scored by Mark Hughes, before Andrei Kanchelskis was sent off for handball. Manchester United won both the Premier League and FA Cup that season, the result denying United a domestic treble, while Villa finished 10th in the Premier League.

Road to Wembley

Aston Villa

Match

Summary

Aston Villa had finished runners-up to Manchester United in the league the previous season, but were in poor form going into the League Cup final, having lost their last three games. The bookmakers and national press were predicting that the Villa would be beaten comfortably at Wembley. Manchester United had suffered a slight blip of their own with a couple of draws in their previous league matches and high-profile red cards to Eric Cantona and Peter Schmeichel – but victory in the League Cup was predicted to be the first part of a domestic treble. Alex Ferguson decided to field a full-strength team with the exception of the suspended Schmeichel, who was deputised by former Villa keeper Les Sealey. Villa boss Ron Atkinson decided to field a five-man midfield with Tony Daley and Dalian Atkinson on the flanks and young attacking midfielder Graham Fenton playing in a withdrawn role behind striker Dean Saunders.

The match began with Aston Villa playing a fast counter-attacking game. United saw a lot of the ball, but the Villa defence, marshalled by former Manchester United centre-back Paul McGrath, rendered Cantona anonymous. There was a scare for Villa when Mark Bosnich looked to have brought down Roy Keane outside the box, but the referee waved play on. Aston Villa's only chance in the first quarter of the match had been an inswinging corner from Steve Staunton which was touched over by Sealey. On 25 minutes, however, Andy Townsend played a pass into the feet of Dean Saunders who flicked the ball over the top of United's defence and into the path of Atkinson, who put his side 1–0 up.

In the second half, the pattern of the game remained the same, United sluggish and Villa playing a counter-attacking game. On 70 minutes, Kevin Richardson tackled United substitute Lee Sharpe who looked certain to score. Five minutes later, Villa went down the other end and earned a free kick when Daley was brought down just outside the United box. Richardson swung it in and Saunders stuck a leg out to divert it into the net for Villa's second goal. Mark Hughes pulled a goal back for United with seven minutes remaining and was denied a second just moments later when Bosnich pushed a volley round the post. With time nearly up Villa broke once more, Daley striking the United post with a fantastic shot. The ball fell to Atkinson who hit it goalwards only for the ball to strike Andrei Kanchelskis on the hand. The Russian was to be red carded and could only watch as Dean Saunders converted the resulting penalty to complete the scoring in a 3–1 victory for Aston Villa.

The match was also the last to be covered on the original BBC Radio 5; the station closed down that night, with BBC Radio Five Live launching the following morning.

Details

References

External links
Game facts at soccerbase.com
Pictures from the final

League Cup Final
League Cup Final 1994
1994
League Cup Final 1994
1993–94 Football League
March 1994 sports events in the United Kingdom